Breese Jacob Stevens (March 22, 1834 – October 28, 1903) was Mayor of Madison, Wisconsin. He held the office from 1884 to 1885.

Biography
Breese J. Stevens was born in Vernon, New York on March 22, 1834.  He was raised in Buffalo, Flint, Michigan, and Vernon, and attended academies in Oneida, Whitesboro, and Cazenovia.  He graduated from Hamilton College in 1853, studied law with attorneys including Timothy Jenkins, and was admitted to the bar. In 1856 he received his Master of Arts degree from Hamilton.

In 1857 he moved to Madison to manage the business interests of two of his relatives, Sidney Breese and Horatio Seymour.  In addition to practicing law, he was involved in banking and other businesses, and he was active in numerous civic organizations, including the Wisconsin Historical Society.  He was also a member of Grace Episcopal Church, and served as a vestryman.

A Democrat, Stevens turned down several opportunities to run for office until 1884, when he ran successfully for Mayor of Madison.  He served one term, 1884 to 1885.

After serving as mayor, Stevens served as a regent of the University of Wisconsin.

Stevens died at his home in Madison on October 28, 1903. He was buried at Forest Hill Cemetery.

Breese Stevens Field is named in his honor. Additionally, Stevens at one time owned the land that the University Heights Historic District now sits on.

References

External links
 

1834 births
1903 deaths
Hamilton College (New York) alumni
Wisconsin lawyers
Wisconsin Democrats
Mayors of Madison, Wisconsin
Burials in Wisconsin